FK Dinamo-Rīnūži/LASD is a Latvian football club located in Riga and playing in the Rīgas zone of the Latvian Second League.

History
In 2007 FK Dinamo-Rīnuži changed name to FK Dinamo-Rīnuži/LASD

Players

First-team squad

Dinamo-Rinuzi

References